Castelgerundo is a new comune (municipality) in the Province of Lodi in the Italian region Lombardy, located about  southeast of Milan and about  southeast of Lodi.

Casrelgerundo borders the following municipalities: Formigara, Castiglione d'Adda, Maleo, Terranova dei Passerini, Pizzighettone, Cavacurta, Codogno.

The new municipality, from 1 January 2018, was made from the union of Cavacurta and Camairago. The municipality contains also the frazione (subdivision) Bosco Valentino e Mulazzana.

History 

The process for union of the municipalities of Camairago and Cavacurta started in 2016. On 22 October 2017 a referendum was held which gave positive results.

The following 28 November the union of the two municipalities was approved by the Regional Council of Lombardy.

References

Enternal Links 
 Official website

Cities and towns in Lombardy